Gaurav Khanna (born 11 December 1975) is the Indian para-badminton team's head national coach.

Coaching 
Abu Hubaida
Palak Kohli
Chirag Baretha
Prem Kumar Ale

References

External links 
  News article with Gaurav Khanna talking about the Dronachrya Award
 News article with Gaurav Khanna talking about the Paralympics

1975 births
Living people
Indian male badminton players
Indian sports coaches
Badminton coaches
Recipients of the Dronacharya Award